The 1995–96 season was the 50th season in Rijeka's history. It was their 5th season in the Prva HNL and 22nd successive top tier season.

Competitions

Prva HNL

First stage

Second stage (relegation play-off)

Results summary

Results by round

Matches

Prva HNL

Source: HRnogomet.com

Croatian Cup

Source: HRnogomet.com

Squad statistics
Competitive matches only.  Appearances in brackets indicate numbers of times the player came on as a substitute.

See also
1995–96 Prva HNL
1995–96 Croatian Cup

References

External links
 1995–96 Prva HNL at HRnogomet.com
 1995–96 Croatian Cup at HRnogomet.com 
 Prvenstvo 1995.-96. at nk-rijeka.hr

HNK Rijeka seasons
Rijeka